The 2022 Grand Prix SAR La Princesse Lalla Meryem was a women's professional tennis tournament played on clay courts. It was the 20th edition of the tournament and part of the WTA 250 category of the 2022 WTA Tour. It took place in Rabat, Morocco, between 15 and 21 May 2022.

Champions

Singles

  Martina Trevisan def.  Claire Liu, 6–2, 6–1

This is Trevisan's first career WTA singles title.

Doubles

  Eri Hozumi /  Makoto Ninomiya def.  Monica Niculescu /  Alexandra Panova 6–7(7–9), 6–3, [10–8]

Points and prize money

Prize money

Singles main draw entrants

Seeds

 Rankings are as of May 9, 2022.

Other entrants
The following players received wildcards into the singles main draw:
  Petra Marčinko
  Garbiñe Muguruza 
  Lulu Sun

The following players received entry from the qualifying draw:
  Cristiana Ferrando
  Ekaterina Reyngold
  You Xiaodi
  Carol Zhao

The following players received entry as lucky losers:
  Tessah Andrianjafitrimo
  Anna Danilina

Withdrawals 
 Before the tournament 
  Magdalena Fręch → replaced by  Marcela Zacarías 
  Beatriz Haddad Maia → replaced by  Catherine Harrison 
  Ivana Jorović → replaced by  Kristina Mladenovic
  Ann Li → replaced by  Kamilla Rakhimova
  Yulia Putintseva → replaced by  Ulrikke Eikeri
  Laura Siegemund → replaced by  Dalma Gálfi
  Alison Van Uytvanck → replaced by  Astra Sharma
  Wang Xinyu → replaced by  Anna Danilina
  Zheng Qinwen → replaced by  Tessah Andrianjafitrimo

Doubles main draw entrants

Seeds 

 1 Rankings as of May 9, 2022.

Other entrants 
The following pairs received wildcards into the doubles main draw:
  Yasmine Kabbaj /  Ekaterina Kazionova

Withdrawals
Before the tournament
  Anna Danilina /  Beatriz Haddad Maia → replaced by  Anastasia Dețiuc /  Yana Sizikova
  Kristina Mladenovic /  Ena Shibahara → replaced by  Clara Burel /  Kristina Mladenovic

References

External links 
 WTA Official website

Morocco Open
Grand Prix SAR La Princesse Lalla Meryem
Grand Prix SAR La Princesse Lalla Meryem
Grand Prix SAR La Princesse Lalla Meryem